Giovanni Lievore (20 March 1932) is a former Italian javelin thrower who competed at the 1956 Summer Olympics, He is the older brother of the former javelin throw world recordman Carlo Lievore.

References

External links 
 

1932 births
Living people
Athletes (track and field) at the 1956 Summer Olympics
Italian male javelin throwers
Olympic athletes of Italy
Athletics competitors of Fiamme Oro
Sportspeople from the Province of Vicenza